Alain Jaubert (born 1940, Paris) is a writer and journalist, producer and director of television, producer of the magazine Les Arts - France 3 and Oceaniques from 1990 to 1993 and author and director of the series "" since 1988. On 29 May 1971, he was victim of a "beating" in a police van when he wanted to accompany a person taken to the police station. The case made a great noise considering the personality of the journalist, then working for Le Nouvel Observateur.

Filmography 
For productions of INA.
 1981 Trois histoires de Chine (54’), INA, diffusion RSS, unpublished in France.
 1982 La Disparition (8’), INA, diffusion Antenne 2.
 La Flèche du temps, séquence dans Le Changement à plus d’un titre (émission anniversaire), INA, diffusion FR3.
 1983 Conversations with Joseph Needham (55’), series "Mémoire", INA, diffusion TF1.
 Passions électriques (13’), INA, diffusion TF1 and RTBF.
 1985 Auschwitz, l’album, la mémoire, INA/HEXAGRAMM, diffusion Antenne 2.
 1986 Le Rhône (56’), series "Les Fleuves de la Méditerranée", INA/RAI/CNRS, diffusion RAI.

For "Océaniques" on FR3
 1988 La bibliothèque idéale, Jorge Luis Borges au Collège de France, conversations with Robert Darnton, and Umberto Eco (2x45’).
 1989 Entretien avec Octavio Paz, conversation with Mario Vargas Llosa.
 1990 Entretien avec Stephen Jay Gould, Le Sacrifice (dabate with Roberto Calasso and René Girard).
 1992 Portrait d’un expert, Federico Zeri (2x55’).

For ARTE
 1993 Citizen Barnes, an américan dream in collaboration with Philippe Pilard.
 Faux et images de faux, in collaboration with François Niney.
 Piero della Francesca.
 La voix.
 La Beat Generation in collaboration with Éric Sarner.
 Manifesto in collaboration with Michel le Bayon.
 1994 Gustave Caillebotte ou les aventures du regard, 60’.
 1988/2002 Series Palettes
 1998 Giacomo Casanova
 1999 La bibliothèque, rêves et légendes
 2001 Nietzsche, un voyage philosophique

France 3
1995: Series Un siècle d'écrivains: Henri Michaux

Books 
1973: Dossier D... comme Drogue, Éditions Alain Moreau 1973
1986: Le Commissariat aux archives, Éditions Barrault, 1986.
 Ne pariez jamais votre tête au diable, translation and presentation of Edgar Allan Poe's short stories, Éditions Gallimard /Folio.
1993: Peinture cinéma et retour, Ministère des Affaires étrangères
1998: Palettes, text of 20 films of the series, Éditions Gallimard/Collection L'Infini
2005: Val Paradis, Prix Goncourt du premier roman.
2008: Lumière de l'image, Gallimard
2008: Une nuit à Pompéi, Gallimard
2011: D'Alice à Frankenstein, Lumière de l'image II, Gallimard
2011: Tableaux noirs, Gallimard
2013: Au bord de la mer violette, Gallimard, Prix Éric Tabarly 2014. 
2015: Casanova l’aventure, Gallimard,
2016: La moustache d'Adolf Hitler et autres essais, Gallimard

External links 
 Alain Jaubert on Babelio
 Alain Jaubert on France Culture
 Collection Palettes - entretien avec Alain Jaubert on YouTube
 Alain Jaubert, La beauté animale on Lectures

20th-century French writers
21st-century French writers
20th-century French journalists
21st-century French journalists
Prix Goncourt du Premier Roman recipients
French television producers
Film directors from Paris
Writers from Paris
1940 births
Living people